Ba-Phalaborwa Local Municipality is located in the Mopani District Municipality of Limpopo province, South Africa. The seat of Ba-Phalaborwa Local Municipality is Phalaborwa.

Main places
The 2011 census divided the municipality into the following main places:

Politics 

The municipal council consists of thirty-seven members elected by mixed-member proportional representation. Nineteen councillors are elected by first-past-the-post voting in nineteen wards, while the remaining eighteen are chosen from party lists so that the total number of party representatives is proportional to the number of votes received. In the election of 1 November 2021 the African National Congress (ANC) won a majority of twenty-four seats on the council.
The following table shows the results of the election.

References

External links 
 Official homepage

Local municipalities of the Mopani District Municipality